Gaz Luri (also Romanized as Gaz Lūrī and Gazloori; also known as Gas Lūrī) is a village in Liravi-ye Shomali Rural District, in the Central District of Deylam County, Bushehr Province, Iran. At the 2006 census, its population was 221, in 42 families.

References 

Populated places in Deylam County